Medvedevo is a rural locality (a village) in Levinskoye Rural Settlement, Bolshesosnovsky District, Perm Krai, Russia. The population was 5 as of 2010. There is 1 street.

Geography 
Medvedevo is located on the Siva River, 26 km southeast of Bolshaya Sosnova (the district's administrative centre) by road. Burdino is the nearest rural locality.

References 

Rural localities in Bolshesosnovsky District